Congaree Creek is a stream in Lexington County, South Carolina formed from the Congaree River. The Name 'Congaree' come's from the River, of the same name. The Battle of Congaree Creek was named after this creek.

Crossings
 Interstate 77
 Old State Road
 12TH Street
 Railroad
 Charleston Highway
 Interstate 26
 Railroad
 Main Street
 Pine Street
 Ramblin Road
 Old Orangeburg Road
 South Lake Drive

Rivers of South Carolina
Rivers of Lexington County, South Carolina